Harry Ward may refer to:

Harry Ward (athlete) (ca. 1901-1965), American college and professional athlete and Negro league baseball player in the 1920s and 1930s
Harry Ward (cricketer) (1924–1993), Australian cricketer
Harry Ward (darts player) (born 1997), English darts player
Harry F. Ward (1873–1966), first national chairman of the American Civil Liberties Union
Harry Marshall Ward (1854–1906), British botanist

See also
Harry Ward Leonard (1861–1915), American electrical engineer and inventor
Henry Ward (disambiguation)